SX 300 or SX-300 may refer to:

 Swearingen SX-300, an aircraft
 SX 300 (superalloy), a superalloy variation of Inconel